Hungarian forint paper money is part of the physical form of the current Hungarian currency, the Hungarian forint. The forint paper money consists exclusively of banknotes. During its history, denominations ranging from 10 to 20,000 forints were put into circulation in correspondence with the inflation which raised needs for higher denominations. Recently, commemorative banknotes were issued as well.

1946 Banknotes 

In 1946, the first series of forint banknotes were put into circulation with the denominations of 10 Ft and 100 Ft. As a consequence of their poor quality (offset printing), many counterfeit appeared in a short time.

1947 Series 

From 1947, a second series of banknotes were designed and put into circulation. These banknotes were printed until 1996 with different coat of arms.

1997 series
Between 1997 and 2001, a new series of banknotes were issued with improved security features. The notes share the common size of 154 × 70 mm. The banknotes are printed by the Hungarian Banknote Printing Corp. in Budapest on paper manufactured by the Diósgyőr Papermill in Miskolc.

The Hungarian National Bank has announced the withdrawal of the 1000 forint notes issued prior to 2006. This affects the 1000 forint note from the current series, but without the red metallic strip on the obverse side, i.e. also the Millennium issue. These notes remained in circulation until August 31, 2007. After this period, the note may be refused for payment. However, commercial banks may exchange these notes thereafter. The Hungarian National Bank will continue to exchange these notes for twenty years, until August 31, 2027.

The 200 forint notes were replaced with a new 200 forint coin in 2009.  (The silver 200 forint coins that were in circulation until 1998 did not see much use at that time.)

2014 series
Beginning in 2014, the Hungarian National Bank issued a revised series of forint banknotes, featuring the same themes as its previous issues, but containing advanced security features. The first banknote issued for this series, the 10,000 forint, was issued into general circulation on 2 September 2014, followed by the 20,000 forint banknote on 25 September 2015, the 2,000 and 5,000 forint banknotes on 1 March 2017, the 1,000 forint banknote on 1 March 2018 and the 500 forint banknote on 1 February 2019.

References

Hungary